Before I Wake (also known as Somnia in some international territories) is a 2016 American dark fantasy horror film directed and edited by Mike Flanagan and co-written by Flanagan and Jeff Howard. The film stars Kate Bosworth, Thomas Jane, Jacob Tremblay, Annabeth Gish, and Dash Mihok. Before I Wake premiered at Fantasia on July 31, 2016, and Netflix released it in the United States on January 5, 2018. The film grossed over $4.9 million worldwide and received favorable reviews from critics.

Plot 
An armed man nervously enters a child's room. A sudden commotion makes him pull the trigger. The gunfire awakens the child and the man breaks down in tears. Later, Jessie and Mark Hobson take in a foster child, eight-year-old Cody Morgan, after their young son Sean dies from accidentally drowning. Social worker Natalie Friedman informs Mark and Jessie that when Cody was three years old, his mother died of cancer, and that two previous attempts to place him with foster parents were unsuccessful.

On his first night with the Hobsons, before Cody goes to sleep, he tells Jessie about a nightmarish creature called "the Canker Man." Jessie brushes the story off and tells Cody that nightmares cannot harm anyone. Later that night, Jessie and Mark are amazed as multicolored butterflies flutter across the living room. Mark tries to capture a blue butterfly to show Cody, as he has a liking for butterflies, but when Cody wakes up the butterflies disappear. The next day at school, he befriends a girl named Annie and antagonizes a mean student. At home, Cody asks Mark who the child in a living room picture is, and Mark replies that it is Sean. That night, the couple see their deceased child and try to hug him. When Cody wakes up, Sean disappears. Upon realizing Cody's gift of making his dreams become reality, Jessie takes advantage of it. After she shows Cody home videos of Sean, her dead son appears and acts out scenes from the videos. Days later, Mark accuses his wife of using Cody for his gift instead of loving him and takes down the pictures of Sean.

Cody falls asleep at school, and "the Canker Man" appears before the mean child and devours him, while Annie watches in horror and screams, waking him up. Meanwhile, Jessie goes to a doctor and complains that her foster child has trouble sleeping; the doctor prescribes medication. She mixes it with Cody's drink, unbeknownst to Mark. That night Sean again appears before them but resembles a monster, and Mark cannot wake Cody up. The Canker Man devours Mark and knocks Jessie unconscious. She wakes as Cody calls 911. Suspicious of Mark's sudden disappearance and suspecting domestic violence, social services takes Cody away to an orphanage.

When Natalie ignores Jessie's requests for help, Jessie steals her files on Cody. She tracks down one of his first foster parents, Whelan Young, the man from the first scene. He tells Jessie that when his wife fell sick, reminding Cody of his mother, she was killed in the same way Mark was. Cody's dreams brought her back as only a hollow replica. Whelan concluded that the only way to stop Cody's nightmares was to put an end to Cody himself, and asks Jessie to try, but she objects. She continues to investigate, and finds a box of Cody's mother's belongings containing a butterfly-shaped pillow and a journal.

Jessie arrives at the orphanage late at night to find it dark and haunted by Cody's nightmares, with the other children tied by vines to the walls. When she finally finds Cody, the Canker Man attacks her until she shows it the butterfly pillow. As she hugs the monster, it takes the form of Cody and disappears along with the vines. Jessie takes the still-unconscious Cody home.

The following day, Jessie reads Cody his mother's journal, which describes how much she had loved him and his gift. Jessie deduces that the Canker Man is actually Cody's fading memories of his mother, pale and disfigured due to the cancer. Jessie expresses admiration for Cody's gift and he acknowledges her as his new mother.

Cast 

 Kate Bosworth as Jessie Hobson
 Thomas Jane as Mark Hobson
 Jacob Tremblay as Cody Morgan
 Annabeth Gish as Natalie Friedman
 Topher Bousquet as The Canker Man
 Dash Mihok as Whelan Young
 Jay Karnes as Peter
 Lance E. Nichols as Detective Brown
 Kyla Deaver as Annie
 Hunter Wenzel as Tate
 Antonio Evan Romero as Sean
 Scottie Thompson as Teacher
 Justin Gordon as Dr. Tennant
 Courtney Bell as Andrea Morgan
Natalie Roers as Katie

Production 
On September 7, 2013, it was announced that Oculus director Mike Flanagan was set to direct a horror film called Somnia he co-wrote with Jeff Howard for Intrepid Pictures, and that the producers would be Trevor Macy and William D. Johnson, with Demarest Films' Sam Englebardt co-producing and co-financing the film with MICA Entertainment headed by Dale Armin Johnson. Focus Features International initially handled international sales of the film. On November 7, 2013, it was announced that Sierra/Affinity would now handle all international rights which were previously held by FFI. On April 4, 2014, Relativity Media acquired the US distribution rights to the film. In March 2015, the title was changed to Before I Wake, apparently over Flanagan's objections.

On November 7, 2013, Kate Bosworth and Thomas Jane joined the lead cast of the film as the child's parents, and Jacob Tremblay was set to play as Cody. On November 18, 2013, Annabeth Gish  joined the cast of the film to play Natalie, the case worker assigned to young Cody.

Filming commenced on November 11, 2013, in Fairhope, Alabama. On December 12, 2013, the crew filmed scenes at Barton Academy. Filming completed on December 16, 2013. The music was composed by Danny Elfman and The Newton Brothers.

Release 
On April 4, 2014, Relativity Media acquired the US distribution rights to the film. The release was originally scheduled for May 8, 2015, but was pushed back to September 25, 2015 and later pulled from the schedule due to the company's filing for bankruptcy. Despite this, the film managed to get a theatrical release in some international territories as early as April 2016. The U.S. release was rescheduled to September 9, 2016, but was again pulled from the schedule.

In June 2016, it was announced that the film would screen at the Fantasia International Film Festival in July. The film had its North American premiere there on July 31, 2016, while still being distributed by Relativity Media. Excluding the United States, Netflix released the movie worldwide on April 28, 2017 and also on Blu-ray and DVD in Canada. Mike Flanagan encouraged U.S. audiences to buy the film on physical media from Canada. In December 2017, it was revealed that Netflix had obtained the United States rights to the film from Relativity Media, thus owning worldwide rights. Netflix released the film in the U.S. on January 5, 2018.

Reception 
The film holds a 66% approval rating on the review aggregator website Rotten Tomatoes based on 35 reviews and an average rating of 6.47/10. At Metacritic, which assigns and normalizes scores of critic reviews, it has a weighted average score of 68 out of 100 based on 5 reviews, indicating "generally favorable reviews."

Ignatiy Vishnevetsky of The A.V. Club gave the film a B grade, writing: "Horror movies that exploit broad childhood phobias about bedtime lights-outs and basement chores are a dime a dozen, but it's really refreshing to find one made with a parent's curiosity and concern for a child's point of view." Brian Tallerico of RogerEbert.com gave the film 2.5/4 stars, deeming it "A flawed film, but there are elements that really work, especially the lead performance and some of Flanagan's gifts with composition." Reagan Gavin Rasquinha of The Times of India was more critical, giving it 2/5 stars and writing: "This is at best, cookie-cutter horror that joins the dots, fine, but it doesn’t dish out anything memorable."

Charles Bramesco of The Guardian ranked it 3rd in a list of the 10 scariest Netflix original films.

Notes

References

External links 
 
 

2016 films
2016 drama films
2016 fantasy films
2016 horror films
2010s horror drama films
American dark fantasy films
American horror drama films
American supernatural horror films
Films about adoption
Films about nightmares
Films directed by Mike Flanagan
Films scored by Danny Elfman
Films scored by the Newton Brothers
Films set in Alabama
Films shot in Alabama
Intrepid Pictures films
Relativity Media films
Supernatural drama films
Supernatural fantasy films
2010s English-language films
2010s American films